Plai Bang is one of the nine subdistricts (tambon) of Bang Kruai District, in Nonthaburi Province, Thailand. Neighbouring subdistricts are (from north clockwise) Bang Muang, Bang Khu Wiang, Maha Sawat, Chimphli, Sala Thammasop and Sala Klang. In 2020 it had a total population of 19,358 people.

Administration

Central administration
The subdistrict is subdivided into 5 administrative villages (muban).

Local administration
The whole area of the subdistrict is covered by Plai Bang Subdistrict Municipality.

References

External links
Website of Plai Bang Subdistrict Municipality

Tambon of Nonthaburi province
Populated places in Nonthaburi province